Lisa Maree Casagrande (born 29 May 1978, Lismore, New South Wales) is an Australian retired footballer. She played at the FIFA Women's World Cup in 1995 (scoring a goal) and 1999, and at the 2000 Olympic Games in Sydney.

Club career
Casagrande played as a forward for the Goonellabah Football Club (1995-1996), the Northern NSW Pride (1996-1997) and the Canberra Eclipse (1997-1999).

International career
Casagrande made her international debut at age 14 in a match against Japan. She represented the Australian team 64 times playing as a midfielder. She played at the 1995 FIFA Women's World Cup, scoring a goal against the United States in the qualification; at the 1999 FIFA Women's World Cup and the 2000 Summer Olympic Games in Sydney.

She competed at the University of Portland from 1999 to 2001, and retired at age 22. In 2013, the Football Federation Australia named her to its "Teams of the Decade" for 1990–1999. In 2015, she was inducted into the Football Federation Australia Hall of Fame.

References

External links
 FIFA profile

Living people
1995 FIFA Women's World Cup players
1978 births
Australian women's soccer players
1999 FIFA Women's World Cup players
Australia women's international soccer players
Women's association football midfielders
Portland Pilots women's soccer players
Sportswomen from New South Wales
Soccer players from New South Wales
People from Lismore, New South Wales
Australian expatriate sportspeople in the United States
Australian expatriate women's soccer players
Expatriate women's soccer players in the United States